Ministry of Civil Services or Ministry of Civil Service may refer to:

 Ministry of Civil Service (Ethiopia)
 Ministry of Civil Service (Kuwait)
 Ministry of Civil Service (Oman)
 Ministry of Civil Service (Saudi Arabia)
 Ministry of Civil Service (Taiwan)
 Ministry of Civil Service Affairs and Housing, Qatar
 Ministry of Civil Service and Administrative Reforms, Mauritius
 Ministry of Civil Service and Insurance, Yemen
 Ministry of Civil Service and Sports (Austria)
 Ministry of the Civil Service (Barbados)
 Shikibu-shō, a ministry in the Imperial Japanese court